Helen Grey Edmonds (December 3, 1911 – May 9, 1995) was an American historian, scholar, and civic leader. She was the first African-American woman to earn a doctorate from Ohio State University, to become a graduate school dean and the first to second the nomination of a United States presidential candidate.

Early life and education
Edmonds was born on December 3, 1911 in Lawrenceville, Virginia, to John Edward and Ann Williams Edmonds. She had a sister, Lucille, and a brother, Harry. Edmonds attended Saint Paul's High School and Junior College in Lawrenceville.

Edmonds attended Morgan State College in Baltimore, graduating in 1933 with a B.A. in History. She went on to receive an M.A. in History at Ohio State University in 1938, followed by a Ph.D. in 1946. She was the first black woman to earn a Ph.D. at that institution. Her dissertation, The Negro and Fusion Politics in North Carolina, 1894-1901, was published as her first book in 1951. From 1954 to 1955, Edmonds conducted postdoctoral research at the University of Heidelberg in West Germany.

Career
From 1934 to 1935, Edmonds taught history, Latin, and Greek at the Virginia Theological Seminary and College in Lynchburg, Virginia. Edmonds joined the faculty of North Carolina College (now North Carolina Central University) in 1941, teaching there until her retirement in 1977. She served in many positions at that institution, including professor of history (1941–77), chair of the Department of History (1963–64), and Dean of the Graduate School of Arts and Sciences (1964–71). In 1989, a classroom building on the campus was named in her honor.

During her career, Edmonds lectured at over 100 colleges and universities in the United States and abroad. She served on the Board of Trustees for several institutions, including North Carolina Central University (after her retirement), Saint Paul's College, and Voorhees College. She received eight honorary degrees during her lifetime.

From 1970 to 1974, Edmonds served as president of The Links, Inc., an organization primarily for African American women. She served on the board of directors of numerous organizations, including the United Negro College Fund and the NAACP Legal Defense and Education Fund.

Civic service and political activities
Edmonds was active in the Republican Party. At the 1956 Republican National Convention, she seconded the nomination of Dwight D. Eisenhower, becoming the first black woman to second the nomination of a U.S. presidential candidate.

In 1970, Edmonds served as an alternate delegate to the General Assembly of the United Nations. She chaired the United States delegation to the Third Committee of the United Nations, and was appointed to the National Advisory Council of the Peace Corps by President Richard Nixon. Nixon cited Edmonds for her service.

Death
Edmonds died at Duke University Hospital in Durham, North Carolina on May 9, 1995, at the age of 83.

Selected publications

Selected awards and recognition
University Distinguished Professor, North Carolina Central University
Eight honorary degrees
Award of Scholarly Distinction, American Historical Association
Distinguished Woman of North Carolina
1975 – O. Max Gardner Award for the "greatest contribution to the welfare of the human race"
1977 – Helen G. Edmonds Graduate Colloquium of History – annual conference established by her former students
1982 – Candace Award, History

References

External links

1911 births
1995 deaths
20th-century American historians
American women historians
African-American historians
African-American non-fiction writers
American women academics
Ohio State University College of Arts and Sciences alumni
North Carolina Central University faculty
People from Lawrenceville, Virginia
20th-century American women writers
Historians from Virginia
20th-century African-American women writers
20th-century African-American writers
Morgan State University alumni
Saint Paul's College (Virginia) alumni